Loxophlebia albicincta is a moth of the subfamily Arctiinae. It was described by Paul Dognin in 1907. It is found in Peru.

References

 Natural History Museum Lepidoptera generic names catalog

Loxophlebia
Moths described in 1907